Tatum Stewart (born 22 February 2002) is a field hockey player from Australia.

Personal life
Tatum Stewart was born and raised in Toowoomba, Queensland.

Stewart was a student at Fairholme College.

Career

Domestic league
In Hockey Australia's domestic league, the Sultana Bran Hockey One, Stewart is a member of the Brisbane Blaze.

Under–21
Tatum Stewart made her junior international debut in 2022 at the Junior Oceania Cup in Canberra. She was a member of the Jillaroos squad that won gold.

Hockeyroos
In 2023, Stewart was named in the Hockeyroos squad for the first time. She will make her debut during season three of the FIH Pro League.

References

External links

2002 births
Living people
Australian female field hockey players
Female field hockey defenders
People from Toowoomba